Gastón Rapolo Silva (born 25 January 1986) is an Argentinean football midfielder who currently plays in the Primera B Metropolitana for UAI Urquiza.

References

External links

1986 births
Living people
Argentine footballers
Association football midfielders
Sportspeople from Buenos Aires Province